Alessandro Livieri (born 21 January 1997) is an Italian football player. He plays for Pisa.

Club career
He was raised in the youth teams of AC Milan. In the 2015–16 season, he began to be included in the senior squad, but did not see any time on the field, serving as a back-up, mostly to Gianluigi Donnarumma.

Before the next season, he moved to Feralpisalò in Serie C. He made his professional debut in Serie C for Feralpisalò on 1 October 2016 against Forlì. 

On 7 September 2019, he signed with Pisa. He spent most of the following two seasons on loans at Serie C.

On 11 December 2021, he made his Serie B debut for Pisa against Lecce, keeping a clean sheet. On 24 January 2022, he extended his contract with Pisa until 2024.

References

External links
 

1997 births

Living people
Footballers from Milan
Italian footballers
Association football goalkeepers
A.C. Milan players
FeralpiSalò players
Pisa S.C. players
Calcio Lecco 1912 players
S.S.D. Pro Sesto players
Serie C players
Serie B players